Liia (or Liialaid) is an island belonging to the country of Estonia. The island is mostly beach ridges and consists of meadows, juniper and pine forrest at its highest points.

See also
List of islands of Estonia

References 

Islands of Estonia
Ridala Parish